Peter McMahon (born 16 October 1981) is an Australian equestrian. He competed in two events at the 2008 Summer Olympics.

References

External links
 

1981 births
Living people
Australian male equestrians
Olympic equestrians of Australia
Equestrians at the 2008 Summer Olympics
People from the Central West (New South Wales)
Sportsmen from New South Wales